Najd or Nejd (Arabic: نجد) is a region of Saudi Arabia. 

Najd or Nejd may also refer to:

 Emirate of Nejd, (1824–1891)
 Sultanate of Nejd, (1921–1926)
 Najd, Gaza, a former Palestinian village near Gaza City
 Al-Nejd, Sultanate of Oman, an archaeological site in Central Oman
 An Najd, a village in Yemen
 Najd FC, a Saudi Arabian football team

See also